Thomas Adam Lukaszuk  (born April 5, 1969) is a Polish-born Canadian politician and former Member of the Legislative Assembly of Alberta. He represented the constituency of Edmonton-Castle Downs from 2001 to 2015 as a Progressive Conservative.  He served in the provincial cabinet from 2010 to 2014, and was the 8th Deputy Premier from 2012 to 2013.

Background 
Lukaszuk was born in Gdynia, Poland. His father defected to Canada from communist Poland, and his family later joined him in 1982. The family lived in Sydney, where Thomas attended school and began to learn English. The family then moved to Alberta, looking for better employment opportunities. He was raised in north Edmonton, went to St. Joseph's High School, and went on to earn a bachelor's degree in education from the University of Alberta and became a social studies teacher with the Edmonton Catholic School District. He started up Injured Workers Advocates Inc. (IWA), a small business which helped injured workers with work-related injury claims. He cites the reward of helping people, and his growing interest in political issues led him to get involved in policy-making.

He served on the Social Care Facilities Review Committee, which gathers Albertans' feedback on the quality of services being provided, and provides recommendations to the Government on how to proceed in that area. He also chaired the Citizens' Appeal Panel, which led to government policy changes surrounding social benefits, and he served on the Alberta Lotteries Review Committee. He conducted a review of Alberta daycares, foster homes, group homes and homeless shelters for the Minister of Children's Services before being elected as an MLA.

Political career

Backbench career 2001–2008 
In 2001, Edmonton-Castle Downs MLA Pamela Paul's retirement opened the door for Lukaszuk to stand for election. Garnering 5,971 votes in the 2001 provincial election, he was able to increase the Progressive Conservative vote share to 51 per cent, up from the 40 per cent Ihor Broda polled in losing to Paul in 1997. Upon his election, he became the first ever Polish-born person to be elected to a Canadian legislature.

In his first term in office, Lukaszuk sponsored Bill 204, a private member's bill known as the Blood Samples Act, which passed third reading on March 31, 2004 and was passed into law on May 11, 2004. The act granted authority to Good Samaritans, front-line emergency workers, police officers, fire fighters, correctional officers, and health service providers to seek an order from the justice system to take a blood sample from a person who has refused to give their consent. The act protected individuals who believed they had come into contact with the body fluid of a person who is infected with a virus that causes a prescribed communicable disease.

In his time as an MLA, Lukaszuk has served on a total of 21 legislative committees, chairing six of them. After being elected to his third term in 2008, Premier Ed Stelmach named him parliamentary assistant to Municipal Affairs Minister Ray Danyluk.

2004 election 
On the night of the 2004 provincial election, Lukaszuk was declared defeated by the Liberal Party candidate Chris Kibermanis, a former draft pick of the NHL's Winnipeg Jets. Unofficial results showed Kibermanis winning by a five-vote margin over Lukaszuk. An automatic judicial recount confirmed Kibermanis's win by three votes rather than five, and Kibermanis was declared the winner by Elections Alberta. However, Lukaszuk appealed the recount three times, to the Alberta Court of Appeals, disputing a number of rejected ballots. The third presiding judge gave Lukaszuk a three-vote margin of victory. The ordeal earned Lukaszuk the moniker "Landslide Lukaszuk," which has been ascribed to him in the local media. Kibermanis again challenged Lukaszuk in the 2008 provincial election, but was defeated by 2,080 votes.

Stelmach cabinet appointment 2010 
On January 13, 2010, Lukaszuk was appointed as Minister of Employment and Immigration in the government of Ed Stelmach.  He introduced a number of reforms to occupational health and safety programs. The changes included releasing information about employers’ safety records online, introducing “blitz” inspections, and hiring additional health and safety officers.

Redford cabinet 2011–2014 
On October 12, 2011, he was sworn in as Minister of Education under Alison Redford. That same day, government provided $107 million in funding to school boards to deal with growth pressures. Over his term, Lukaszuk would change the provisions for public education in Morinville to make it the same as elsewhere in the province, and reduce the administrative burden for charter schools.

Redford appointed him Deputy Premier on May 8, 2012, and in July named him as Ministerial Liaison to the Canadian Forces. On February 4, 2013 he was appointed as Minister of Enterprise and Advanced Education. In July 2013, he was named one of the 50 most influential Albertans for having “proven himself to be one of the most capable and influential members” of the government.

In a cabinet shuffle on December 6, 2013, he was replaced as Deputy Premier by Dave Hancock, Minister of Innovation and Advanced Education, and given responsibility for a new ministry of Jobs, Skills, Training and Labour.

Lukaszuk resigned from cabinet on May 22, 2014 in order to stand in the Alberta Progressive Conservative Association's leadership election after Redford was forced to resign from the premiership due to a scandal concerning her expenses. During the campaign scandals arose regarding roaming charges of more than $20,000 charged to taxpayers during a personal vacation and revelations concerning the presence of his daughter on government flights. He placed third with 11.4% support in the vote that elected Jim Prentice party leader.

Lukaszuk was not re-appointed to the cabinet of Jim Prentice when he formed government. During the Alberta election on May 5, 2015, he lost his seat in the legislative assembly.

Controversies
In spring 2013 the Progressive Conservatives tabled their first Alberta budget since reelection. The government failed to honour its 2012 provincial election promises to continue to increase post-secondary education at a rate of 2%. Instead the budget was cut by 7.2%. A 9.2% shortfall. Lukaszuk, as the newly appointed Deputy Premier and Minister of Enterprise and Advanced Education, presided over these controversial cuts and layoffs at Alberta's colleges and universities. 
Post-secondary institutions were given a letter of expectation with regards to spending priorities, which was released publicly by University of Alberta. The ongoing controversy surrounding the branding of "Campus Alberta" in this letter has been closely covered by media outlets. Lukaszuk has also made it clear that post-secondary institutions should not make up shortfalls with tuition increases  or otherwise additional fees. However, actual students costs have been impacted. At University of Alberta alone, $500,000 in scholarships to attract top students were cut to make up this loss. Graduate funding has also been reduced and in many cases removed. Administrator salaries were not cut due to a collective bargaining agreement. Lukaszuk confirmed that the government would send in a special team of independent financial consultants to review university books and to find faster budget cuts. These consultants never showed up.

On October 9, 2013, following 900 academic staff and faculty job losses across the province, Lukazuk announced $142.5 million had come available to construct a new Engineering building at University of Calgary. This figure was a controversial amount, close to the $147 million needed to reverse cuts eight months before. The decision was also at odds with Lukaszuk's written assurances to university administrators on July 3, 2013 that he would advocate to reverse the budget cuts if additional money became available:  "Look guys, you’re not happy, I’m not happy with this budget. But this is the reality.... The moment I have any extra dollars I can access, I’ll be the first on my knees before the treasury board advocating for you to get your dollars. But in the meantime, get your financial houses in order," he said. $50 million in additional operating funds was provided in November 2013, eight months after the budget was tabled. The delay caused permanent layoffs and closures of programs across the province. Lukaszuk has since been reassigned to a different government file.

Personal life

Lukaszuk enjoys travelling, reading and participating in activities with his family. He coached soccer through the Edmonton Northwood Community League, has been a Scout leader and is a strong supporter of the Hope Foundation, Camp fYrefly, and ABC Headstart. He is a past president of the Youth Friendship Society. He has been decorated with the Queen's Golden Jubilee Medal for his community service and the Alberta Centennial Medal for his contributions to the province.

Lukaszuk is an active member of the Castle Downs Recreation Society, which builds playgrounds in developing countries. He has been involved in projects in the Philippines and Vietnam, and is currently supporting one in Nicaragua.

Lukaszuk has two daughters, one with his current wife, news anchor Stacey Brotzel CTV Edmonton and one with his previous wife.

Election results

2015 general election

2012 general election

2008 general election

2004 general election 
{| class="wikitable"
| colspan="3" align=center|2004 Alberta general election results ( Edmonton-Castle Downs )
| colspan="2"|Turnout 41.3%
|-
| colspan="2" rowspan="1" align="left" valign="top" | Affiliation
| valign="top" |Candidate
| valign="top" |Votes
| valign="top" align="right"|%

2001 general election

References

External links
Thomas Lukaszuk MLA
CDRS International CDRS website

1969 births
Canadian people of Polish descent
Living people
Members of the Executive Council of Alberta
People from Gdynia
Politicians from Edmonton
Progressive Conservative Association of Alberta MLAs
Deputy premiers of Alberta
21st-century Canadian politicians